Monreath is a historic plantation house located near Ingleside, Franklin County, North Carolina, USA. It was built about 1790 and is a two-story, "L"-shaped, Georgian style frame dwelling with a hipped roof and two-story rear ell. It is sheathed in weatherboard and has exterior end chimneys.

It was listed on the National Register of Historic Places in 1975.

References

Plantation houses in North Carolina
Houses on the National Register of Historic Places in North Carolina
Houses completed in 1790
Georgian architecture in North Carolina
Houses in Franklin County, North Carolina
National Register of Historic Places in Franklin County, North Carolina